The Antillean euphonia (Chlorophonia musica) is a bird species in the finch family, Fringillidae (formerly in Thraupidae).
It is found in all the main islands of the Lesser Antilles, as well as Hispaniola (Dominican Republic and Haiti) and Puerto Rico.
Its natural habitats are subtropical or tropical dry forest, subtropical or tropical moist lowland forest, and heavily degraded former forest.

It was formerly classified in the genus Euphonia, but phylogenetic evidence indicates that it groups with Chlorophonia.

See also

Fauna of Puerto Rico
List of Puerto Rican birds
List of Vieques birds

References

External links
Stamps (for Lesser Antilles islands & countries-(12 stamp issues))
Photo gallery - VIREO
Artwork graphic (thumb); Article, High Res Graphic - oiseaux

Antillean euphonia
Birds of the Lesser Antilles
Endemic birds of the Caribbean
Birds of Hispaniola
Birds of the Dominican Republic
Birds of Haiti
Birds of Puerto Rico
Antillean euphonia
Antillean euphonia
Taxonomy articles created by Polbot
Taxobox binomials not recognized by IUCN